Annie Williams may refer to:

Annabelle Williams  Australian Swimmer, OAM
Annie Williams (suffragette) (c. 1860–1943), British women's rights activist
Annie Williams (painter) (born 1942), British watercolor artist